Jacksonville College is a private junior college in Jacksonville, Texas.  It is the only accredited junior college in Texas that is privately owned and operated, owned by the Baptist Missionary Association of America, with additional financial support provided by Southern Baptists of Texas, the conservative state convention affiliated with the Southern Baptist Convention.

The college's current president is Dr. Joe Lightner, who has served in that capacity since 2021.

The college is known for its singing groups - a main choir, a smaller group called The Singers, a women's trio, and a men's quartet.

Jacksonville College, the oldest junior college in the state of Texas, opened in 1899 and has operated continuously since that time, though before 1918 it operated as a four-year institution.

The college believes in the importance of each student making a personal commitment to Christianity, make behavioral changes in Christian applications to 21st century personal, family, community, and global issues, endorse lifelong Christian learning for their vocation, and broaden Biblical literacy.

External links
 Official website

Reference 

Baptist Christianity in Texas
Universities and colleges affiliated with the Southern Baptist Convention
Private universities and colleges in Texas
Educational institutions established in 1899
Universities and colleges accredited by the Southern Association of Colleges and Schools
Two-year colleges in the United States
1899 establishments in Texas
NJCAA athletics